A Dynamic Binaural Recording is a type of Binaural recording where the sound source appears to changes position with the change in position of the user. It is used in Virtual reality applications, where the user is moving and the source of sound appears to change position, along with the user in 3D space. A combination of Head tracking and Binaural recording are used to generate the Dynamic Binaural recording. User's head in space is tracked and Binaural audio is played into headphones with respect to the position of user's head. This creates a realistic effect of sound, with freedom of movement to the user.

See also

Binaural recording
Head-related transfer function

References

 

Binaural recordings